Ellis Beach is a coastal locality in the Cairns Region, Queensland, Australia.

Geography

The Ellis Beach locality also contains the nearby off-shore Double Island, also known by its native Aboriginal name Wangal Djungay.

History 
Ellis Beach is situated in the Djabugay (Tjapukai) traditional Aboriginal country. 
The Cairns Historical Society's records show that it was named after Dick Ellis, who at the time resided at this beach. He was a shot firer for the Queensland Department of Main Roads – presumably at the time the Cook Highway was constructed in the early 1930s. He lost a hand and the Queensland Government constructed a house for him at the beach now known as Ellis Beach on the spot where the café now stands. This was about 1940 and Dick Ellis died in 1960.

Before World War II the area was unnamed (in English) and had no houses. It was only during the war years that it became known as Ellis Beach and this fits with all other records. There are a number of mango trees at Ellis Beach, which it is believed were tended by Mr Ellis. After the construction of the Cook Highway through the area the authorities decided to plant many varieties of trees along each side of the roadway. This was done where the terrain permitted. Mangoes were particularly suitable for this purpose and many of the original trees survive along with other flowering trees. Those along the stretch of road at Ellis Beach would no doubt owe their existence to Dick Ellis. In other areas drought and fire have taken their toll but some still exist.

At the 2006 census, Ellis Beach had a population of 30.

Amenities
Ellis Beach is also home to the Ellis Beach Surf Lifesaving Club which regularly hosts competitions and events. From November to May, a stinger net patrolled by the club helps protect swimmers from marine "stingers" (jellyfish species of Chironex and Irukandji) which inhabit the waters during those months. Ellis Beach features pumice stones along its beautiful shores.

There is a camping ground and a bar and grill restaurant.

In popular culture

Ellis Beach was featured in the fourth season of The Amazing Race.

Gallery

References

External links 

Populated places in Far North Queensland
Beaches of Queensland
Suburbs of Cairns
Localities in Queensland